The Focke-Wulf 1000x1000x1000, also known as Focke-Wulf Fw 239, was a twinjet bomber project for the Luftwaffe, designed by the Focke-Wulf aircraft manufacturing company during the last years of the Third Reich.

Their designation meant that these bombers would be able to carry a bomb that weigh 1000 kg for a distance of 1000 km at a speed of 1000 km/h.

History 
Focke-Wulf produced three different designs of the project that would have been powered by two Heinkel HeS 011 turbojet engines. The innovative-looking series of jet bombers was designed by H. von Halem and D. Küchemann. The project was cancelled because of the surrender of Nazi Germany.

Variants
The Focke-Wulf 1000x1000x1000 project had three different variants. All of them were twin-jet bombers that would be powered by two Heinkel-Hirth He S 011 turbojets.

Fw 1000x1000x1000 A 
Jet-powered bomber project that looked conventional. It had thin wings, swept back at 35 degrees.

Fw 1000x1000x1000 B 
A flying wing design with a small fuselage containing the cockpit and the front undercarriage wheel.

Fw 1000x1000x1000 C 
A twin jet bomber project with a crew of three quite similar to the Fw 1000x1000x1000 A with a wingspan of 12.65 m and a length of 14.2 m.

See also

References

External links

World War II jet aircraft of Germany
1940s German bomber aircraft
1000x1000x1000
Flying wings